Juchnowiec Dolny  is a village in the administrative district of Gmina Juchnowiec Kościelny, within Białystok County, Podlaskie Voivodeship, in north-eastern Poland.

The village has a population of 540.

References

Juchnowiec Dolny
Białystok Voivodeship (1919–1939)
Belastok Region